Wang Chao (Chinese:王超 born September 15, 1975 in Qingdao) is a former Chinese football player who spent his whole career for Shandong Luneng.

Club career
In the 1995 league season Wang Chao would begin his professional football career with Shandong Luneng after being promoted from their youth team. With them he would progress as their first choice left-back after several season. Once he started to establish himself as a permanent member of the Shandong he saw them establish themselves as a dominant force within the Chinese league system. After spending his entire professional career with Shandong and winning numerous league title's Wang Chao would retire by the end of the 2008 league season.

Honours
 Chinese Jia-A League/Chinese Super League: 1999, 2006, 2008
 Chinese FA Cup: 1999, 2004, 2006

References

External links
Player profile at football-lineups.com
Player stats at sohu.com

1975 births
Living people
Chinese footballers
Footballers from Qingdao
Shandong Taishan F.C. players
Chinese Super League players
Association football defenders